Rayman Raving Rabbids: TV Party (also known as Rayman Raving Rabbids 3) is a party video game developed and published by Ubisoft in 2008 and is the third installment in the original Rayman Raving Rabbids''' trilogy.

The Rabbids take control of Rayman's TV station and monopolize their transmissions during a whole week. Each day of this week contains a different set of minigames, and some of them make use of the Wii Balance Board. All the minigames follow the TV theme, being based on films, fitness programs, gardening programs and all sorts of shows. The "ads" are present in the form of microgames which appear randomly during gameplay, lasting only a few seconds. Clearing a microgame awards a bonus to the winning player. The game allows up to 8 players in turn based mode and this is the last Rabbids game to feature Rayman until Mario + Rabbids: Sparks of Hope as a downloadable content. It is followed by Rabbids Go Home.

Gameplay
Unlike its predecessors, the game supports the Wii Balance Board accessory. Several mini-games support use of the Balance Board, including dance and racing games - notably, the 'first video game you can play with your butt.'

The minigames consist of a channel system, each channel giving hold to specific minigames, in the same setting. For example, the X-TRM Sports, consist of racing on the belly of a yak down a hill, doing jumps, or a parody of MTV's Jackass that involves the player diving off an unfinished skyscraper, drawing shapes to fit through boards with holes in them. Other minigames involve a Plunger FPS similar to the other games. But this time, the player shoots plungers at a specific clothed Rabbid that does not belong in a movie, and in the ending, the ability to shoot is disabled for the whole ending for that minigame. Also, there are various games tied to dancing, wrestling, even a Rock Band experience. The player can run over other rabbids with a giant tractor, try to flip burgers, or possibly destroy a city as a fire-breathing Rabbid on a take of Godzilla. In the DS version of the game, the game replaced some games with new games. Also, there's a change to the minigame "Prison Fake". This time, the player has to find an item somewhere in the prison using the touch screen.

Plot
Rayman runs away from a group of Rabbids while lightning strikes. As Rayman reaches his house, another strike causes the Rabbids to be teleported into the TV antenna, down the wire, and get trapped in the TV. Rayman turns on the TV and suddenly, the Rabbids are merged with the TV, transform into cartoon versions of themselves, and start to appear on their own channels in their own service: Trash TV, Groove On, Shake It, The Raving Channel, Cult Movies, X-trm Sports, Macho TV, and No Brainer Channel.

During the week, Rayman tries to get rid of the Rabbids, who are constantly annoying him and putting his patience to the test. First, on Monday, he tries simply pulling the plug, but this doesn't stop them from messing around with the TV. Hitting the TV with his fist and then an ice pack Tuesday night causes the screen to slowly crack throughout the game. On Wednesday, after taping the TV doesn't get rid of the Rabbids' noise control after having two consecutive sleepless nights, he throws it out of the house, only to have it given back to him by moles who also got annoyed the next day. On Friday, Rayman throws it on the toilet, where the Rabbids make use of their time by breaking the forth wall and using a hook outside the TV to repeatedly flush the toilet. When he sees this the following day, he decides to drown them in the sink, but the whole house shakes when the Rabbids scream.

Finally, the following night, he changes the channel to watch a rugby game on Sunday night, but it kept getting interrupted by the Rabbids. Even though he tried to keep changing the channel, it doesn't work, and Rayman, pushed to his breaking point, breaks the TV with his shoe and frees them, undoing the effects of the TV and the Rabbids, and returning them to their original forms. He flees from his house as the Rabbids chase him again, while one Rabbid stays inside and takes up residence of the now abandoned house.

ReceptionRayman Raving Rabbids: TV Party'' received mixed reviews. It was nominated for multiple Wii-specific awards by IGN for its 2008 video game awards, including Best Use of Sound, Best Family Game, and Best Use of the Wii Balance Board. This game also got a 7.0 from IGN.com and a 7.4 from GameTrailers.com.

As of January 2009, the game had sold 1.5 million copies.

References

External links 
 Rabbids.com
 Rayman Raving Rabbids TV Party at IGN

2008 video games
Party video games
Rayman
Rabbids
Wii games
Ubisoft games
Nintendo DS games
Wii Balance Board games
Multiplayer and single-player video games
Video games about rabbits and hares
Video games developed in France
Video games scored by Mark Griskey